Panjnad Headworks (Punjabi)  is located in Punjab, Pakistan. It is a beautiful picnic spot and an agricultural area near Uch, Bahawalpur and it is where all the five rivers of Punjab merge. 

Panjnad Headworks or Panjnad barrage has three canals: Panjnad canal, Abbassia canal, and Abbassia link canal. In 2020 head punjnad barrage remodelling done to increase it water passing capacity for semi-automatic control of gates. These canals irrigate Bahawalpur and Rahim Yar Khan districts and the northern Sindh area.

See also 
 Panjnad River

References

Rivers of Punjab (Pakistan)
Indus basin
Rivers of Pakistan

cs:Pandžnád
de:Panjnad
simple:Panjnad River
sv:Panjnad